Varifula is a genus of moths belonging to the family Tortricidae.

Species
Varifula fulvaria Blanchard, in Gay, 1852
Varifula trancasiana Razowski & Pelz, 2010

References

 , 1995, Acta zoologica cracoviensia 38: 279.
 , 2005, World Catalogue of Insects 5
  2010: Tortricidae from Chile (Lepidoptera: Tortricidae). Shilap Revista de Lepidopterologia 38 (149): 5-55.

External links
tortricidae.com

Euliini
Tortricidae genera
Taxa named by Józef Razowski
Endemic fauna of Chile